Peadar Healy (born 1963) is a former Irish Gaelic football manager and former player. He was the manager of the Cork senior team from 2015 to 2017

Born in Ballyvourney, County Cork, Healy was introduced to Gaelic football at a young age. He enjoyed success at schools' level  while simultaneously enjoying championship successes in minor and under-21 divisional grades with the Naomh Abán club. Healy also won a championship medal in the junior grade.

Healy made his debut on the inter-county scene at the age of sixteen when he first linked up with the Cork minor team. An All-Ireland medallist in this grade, he also won an All-Ireland medal as a non-playing substitute with the under-21 team.

In retirement from playing Healy has become involved in team management and coaching. As a selector and coach with the Cork senior team, he helped guide the team to the All-Ireland title in 2010. He also worked as a coach with club sides O'Donovan Rossa and Dr. Croke's. Healy was appointed manager of the Cork senior team on 17 October 2015.

Playing career

Inter-county

Healy first played for Cork as a member of the minor team on 3 May 1980. He scored 0-7 from centre-forward on his debut in a 2-18 to 0-4 Munster quarter-final defeat by Clare. Cork's championship campaign ended without success that year, however, Healy was eligible for the grade once again in 1981. He won a Munster medal that year following a narrow 0-9 to 1-5 defeat of Kerry. On 20 September 1981 Cork faced Derry in the All-Ireland decider. A hat-trick of goals by Colm O'Neill powered Cork to a 4-9 to 2-7 victory and an All-Ireland Minor Football Championship medal for Healy.

By this stage Healy was also a member of the Cork under-21 team. He was an unused substitute in 1980 as Cork secured the Munster and All-Ireland titles following respective victories over Kerry and Dublin.

Coaching career

Cork manager

On 17 October 2015 Healy was appointed manager of the Cork senior football team. He claimed his first silverware as manager when Cork defeated Clare to take the McGrath Cup in early 2016.
After defeat to mayo in extra time of the 2017 all ireland championship qualifiers , healy told his players he would be stepping down as manager of cork senior footballers

Career statistics

Manager

Honours

Player

Naomh Abán
Cork Junior Football Championship (1): 1988

Cork
All-Ireland Under-21 Football Championship (1): 1980 (sub)
Munster Under-21 Football Championship (1): 1980 (sub)
All-Ireland Minor Football Championship (1): 1981
Munster Minor Football Championship (1): 1981

Selector

Cork
All-Ireland Senior Football Championship (1): 2010
Munster Senior Football Championship (3): 2008, 2009, 2012
National Football League (Division 1) (3): 2010, 2011, 2012
National Football League (Division 2) (1): 2009

Manager

Cork
McGrath Cup (1): 2016

References

1963 births
Living people
Naomh Abán Gaelic footballers
Cork inter-county Gaelic footballers
Gaelic football managers
Gaelic football selectors